Arnaud Boissières (born 20 July 1972) is a French professional offshore sailor.

Career highlights

References

External links
 Official Facebook Page

1972 births
Living people
Sportspeople from Gironde
French male sailors (sport)
IMOCA 60 class sailors
French Vendee Globe sailors
2008 Vendee Globe sailors
2012 Vendee Globe sailors
2016 Vendee Globe sailors
2020 Vendee Globe sailors
Vendée Globe finishers
Single-handed circumnavigating sailors
People from Talence